Dreamaker was a Spanish power metal band, formed by three former Dark Moor members, following the band's split.

Biography
Dreamaker begun when vocalist Elisa Martin, guitarist Albert Maroto and drummer Jorge Sáez left Dark Moor, in 2003, due to musical differences. They were soon joined by second guitarist Matias Sosa and bassist Carlos Peña and Dark Moor's former keyboard player, Roberto Camús, who had left the band in 2002, offered to play with Dreamaker, but left the band in a short time and was replaced by Nino Ruiz.

The band received a recording deal from Arise Records for two albums in September of that year, and proceeded to record their first album - Human Device. It was released throughout Europe, Japan and in a few Spanish-speaking countries in early 2004.

A Japanese tour followed in May and, while in the country, guitarists Albert Maroto and Matias Sosa recorded a video for Young Guitar Magazine.

Dreamaker then recorded the album Enclosed, in March 2005, introducing more electronic and mainstream elements into their sound.

Discography

Studio albums
 Human Device (2004)
 Enclosed (2005)

Line-up
Elisa C. Martin - Vocals
Albert Maroto - Guitars
Carlos "Ke Patxa" Peña - Bass
Jorge Sáez - Percussion

External links 
 Dreamaker on MySpace
 Dreamaker on Metal-Archives
 Official Facebook Elisa C. Martin

Spanish power metal musical groups
Musical groups established in 2003